Raúl Alonso Jiménez Rodríguez (born 5 May 1991) is a Mexican professional footballer who plays as a forward for  club Wolverhampton Wanderers and the Mexico national team.

Jiménez began his career in Club América's youth system before debuting in the first division in October 2011. He won his first championship with América in 2013, winning the Clausura tournament, and was the team's second-highest goalscorer. In August 2014, Jiménez joined Spanish side Atlético Madrid. After one season he signed for Benfica. He amassed 120 appearances and scored 31 goals during his three years with the Portuguese side, winning two consecutive league titles, among other major honours. In June 2018, Jiménez joined Wolverhampton Wanderers on loan, and was the team's top-scorer with 17 goals across all competitions. He joined Wolves on a permanent basis the following year, and became an instrumental and prolific striker, though spent nine months out with a serious head injury between November 2020 and August 2021.

Jiménez was a part of the Mexico under-23 squad that won the gold medal at the Summer Olympics in 2012. A full international since 2013, Jiménez has represented his country at the 2014, 2018 and 2022 FIFA World Cup, the 2013 and 2019 CONCACAF Gold Cup, the 2013 and 2017 FIFA Confederations Cup, the 2015 Copa América, and the Copa América Centenario. He currently sits joint-eighth on the all time scorer list with 29 goals, alongside Hugo Sánchez.

Club career

América

2011–12 season
Jiménez began his career playing for Club América's youth system, being considered a promising young striker. On 9 October 2011, under interim-coach Alfredo Tena, Jiménez made his professional debut during the Apertura tournament against Monarcas Morelia, in a match which ended in a 1–1 draw. He scored his first goal on 30 October in a 2–3 loss to Puebla, scoring in the 2nd minute of the match. He appeared six times and scored one goal in his debut tournament.

Jiménez did not appear in the Clausura 2012 until 11 February—week seven of the tournament—against Atlas, which ended in a 1–1 draw, coming on as a second-half substitute for Christian Bermúdez. He scored his first goal of the tournament on 9 March in the 1–1 draw against Tijuana at the Estadio Caliente. Jiménez appeared twelve times and scored once during the Clausura, with América being eliminated in the semi-finals by Monterrey.

2012–13 season
After participating in the Summer Olympics with Mexico and the sale of Vicente Matías Vuoso, Jiménez won a spot in América's starting eleven for the Apertura 2012 tournament, playing as a second-striker alongside Christian Benítez in manager Miguel Herrera's 5–3–2 tactical scheme. He was also given the vacant number 9 shirt, switching from the number 47 shirt he debuted with. Jiménez scored on 15 September in the 2–0 victory over Santos Laguna at the Estadio Azteca. He would go on to score two weeks later in the 1–1 draw against Monarcas Morelia. Jiménez received his first red card during América's 2–1 victory over San Luis, meaning he would miss El Súper Clásico against Guadalajara. On 3 November, he scored the second goal in the 4–0 win over Pachuca. On 17 November, Jiménez scored in the 1–2 defeat to Morelia in the second-leg of the quarter-final. Despite the loss, América won the series by a 3–2 aggregate score and advanced to the semi-finals. América would ultimately be eliminated in the semi-finals by Toluca. Jimenéz ended the tournament with sixteen appearances and scoring four goals.

Jiménez began the Clausura 2013 tournament as a starter in the first two league matches, and scored his first brace in the 4–0 victory over Atlante on 19 January. He bagged another brace on 2 February in América's 3–0 win against Querétaro. On 31 March, Jiménez scored two headers in the 2–0 victory over Guadalajara at the Estadio Omnilife. Jimenéz finished the regular phase of the tournament with eight goals, and scored in América's 1–0 away win over Pumas UNAM in the first-leg of the quarter-final series of the playoffs on 8 May. In the second-leg of the semi-final series against Monterrey, Jimenéz scored from a penalty and assisted Christian Benitez in the second goal to win the match 2–1 (4–3 on aggregate), sending América to the Final against Cruz Azul. Jiménez played in both legs and scored in the subsequent penalty shoot-out which América ultimately won, thus being crowned league champions.

2013–14 season
On 3 August 2013, Jiménez scored his first goal of the Apertura tournament in the 3–0 win over Atlas. He would go on to score in each of the next three matches in wins over Atlante, Pachuca, and Morelia, respectively, taking his goal tally to four goals in five matches played. He would score again on 13 September in América's 1–2 defeat to Santos Laguna. On 5 October, Jiménez scored a header and assisted in Luis Gabriel Rey's goal in the 2–0 victory over Guadalajara. Jiménez ended the regular-phase of the Apertura with seven goals in twelve games played. He scored in the second-leg of the quarter-finals against Tigres UANL which ended in a 1–1 draw at the Estadio Azteca on 1 December, with América advancing, despite a 2–2 aggregate score, due to the away-goals rule. América would win the semi-final matches against Toluca and advance once again to the league final, though failing to achieve the repeat after losing both legs to León.

The Clausura 2014 tournament saw Jiménez make 17 appearances and score 8 goals. In the quarter-final match against Santos Laguna on 30 April, Jiménez scored a hat-trick in the 5–3 win. However, América would lose the second-leg of the series 1–3 and being eliminated from the playoffs, despite a 6–6 aggregate score due to the away-goals rule.

2014–15 season
Jiménez began the Apertura 2014 tournament scoring four goals in the first three games. On 26 July, he scored the first goal in América's 2–1 win over Tijuana. On 4 August, he scored a hat-trick and assisted Oribe Peralta in the 4–0 win against Puebla. Jiménez played his final game for América on 9 August 2014 against Tigres UANL, providing the assist for the second goal scored by Miguel Layún in the 2–0 win.

Atlético Madrid

On 13 August 2014, Atlético Madrid reached an agreement with Club América for Jiménez, for a fee reported to be in the region of €11 million. The following day, he signed a six-year deal after passing the medical examination. Jiménez made his debut on 16 August, in the final of the Ramón de Carranza Trophy pre-season tournament against Sampdoria, starting the match and being substituted out in the 79th minute. Atlético won 2–0.

Jiménez made his competitive debut in the first leg of the Supercopa de España on 19 August, a 1–1 draw against Real Madrid, playing the final 12 minutes in place of fellow debutant Mario Mandžukić. Jiménez played in the second leg as well coming in as a substitute for Antoine Griezmann in the 73rd minute of the match, the game ended in a 1–0 win and an aggregated score of 2–1.

Jiménez made his La Liga debut on 25 August 2014, in a goalless draw against Rayo Vallecano. He scored his first league goal for Atlético on 27 September, in a 4–0 win against Sevilla, coming off the bench. It was his only goal for Atlético that season.

Benfica
On 9 August 2015 Jiménez, who was expected to complete a loan deal to Premier League side West Ham, failed to show up to his medical after reports claimed he had missed his flight to London after he had overslept. However, multiple sources had reported his agent Jorge Mendes had suggested he spurn the move, in favour of a move to Primeira Liga side Benfica.

On 13 August 2015, Jiménez joined Portuguese champions Benfica, signing a five-year deal. Benfica spent €9.836 million to bring Jiménez to the club, although this included unspecified amounts on agent's fees and signing-on fees in addition to the transfer fee itself. The €9.836 million may have included a €1 million transfer fee, and €3 million to acquire 50% of the player's economic rights.

2015–16 season

Jiménez scored his first goal for Benfica on 29 August against Moreirense, scoring a header in the 75th minute to level the score 1–1, with Benfica eventually winning the match 3–2.

On 26 November, Jiménez scored his first two goals in the UEFA Champions League, striking at both ends in each half as Benfica salvaged a 2–2 away draw against Astana. On 9 March 2016, he helped Benfica to reach the quarter-finals of the Champions League in a 2–1 away victory against Zenit Saint Petersburg. In the 85th minute of the match, Jimenéz struck a long-range shot which was saved by Yuri Lodygin onto the bar, with the ball rebounding to Nicolás Gaitán who tied the match 1–1. On 9 April, he came off the bench and scored the winning goal in the 2–1 victory against Académica, securing Benfica's lead in the Primeira Liga. Four days later, due to the suspension of Jonas in the first leg, Jiménez started the second leg of the Champions League quarter-final match against Bayern Munich, scoring the first goal in the 2–2 draw at the Estádio da Luz; a 3–2 defeat on aggregate meant Benfica were eliminated from the competition.

On 24 April, he scored another winner in the league, this time scoring the lone goal against Rio Ave, extending Benfica's lead in the league. On 15 May, Jiménez came on as a second-half substitute as Benfica were crowned league champions after defeating Nacional 4–1. Five days later, he capped off the season scoring from the penalty spot in the 6–2 win over Marítimo in the Taça da Liga final, where he also finished as the competition's top goalscorer with four goals.

2016–17 season
On 21 July 2016, it was announced that Benfica had purchased the remaining 50% of Jiménez's economic rights for €12 million. It was widely reported that this had brought the total value of his transfer to around €22 million, making Jiménez the most expensive player in Portuguese football history (this remains unsubstantiated, since the €9.836 million spent by Benfica in 2015 included various costs besides the transfer fee) and the most expensive Mexican player. In that season, he played in the Taça de Portugal final, which Benfica won over Vitória de Guimarães (2–1).

2017–18 season
Jiménez came off the bench to score Benfica's final goal in their 3–1 Super Cup win over Vitória de Guimarães. On 17 December, Jiménez made his 100th appearance for Benfica in all competitions following an away 5–1 win over Tondela.

Wolverhampton Wanderers

2018–19 season as loan
On 12 June 2018, Benfica loaned out Jiménez to newly promoted Premier League side Wolverhampton Wanderers on a season-long loan for a fee of €3 million, with a buyout clause of €38 million. On 29 June, it was reported that he had extended his contract with Benfica until June 2021 before being loaned out.

Jiménez made his unofficial debut with the team on 22 July in a semifinal match against VfL Bochum in the H-Hotels Cup, where he failed to convert a penalty, the first following his perfect conversion rate. On 11 August, Jiménez marked his competitive debut for Wolves by scoring the equalizing goal that earned the home team a 2–2 draw with visiting Everton on the opening weekend of the Premier League season. On 16 September, Jiménez scored the only goal in the victory over Burnley. On 22 September, he provided an assist to João Moutinho to tie the match 1–1 against Manchester United in the league. On 29 September, he provided an assist to Ivan Cavaleiro to score the first goal in a 2–0 victory over Southampton. On 6 October, Jiménez provided the assist for Matt Doherty's goal in his team's 1–0 away victory over Crystal Palace; it was his third assist of the season, meaning Jiménez was involved in a goal in each of the previous four league games for Wolves, assisting in the past three after scoring in the game prior to that. On 11 November, he provided the assist to Ivan Cavaleiro in the 1–1 draw against Arsenal, taking his season assist tally to four. Jiménez scored Wolves' first goal in a 2–1 win against Chelsea at Molineux on 5 December. Jiménez scored the first goal in Wolves's 2–0 win over Bournemouth on 15 December. This was the first time Wolves had won three consecutive Premier League games and the first time Wolves had won three in a row in the top flight of English football since 1980.

On 10 March 2019, with his goal for Wolves in their 1–1 draw against Chelsea, Jiménez tied Steven Fletcher as the Wolves player with the most Premier League goals scored in a single season with twelve. Six days later, Jiménez scored the first goal for Wolverhampton in a 2–1 home victory over Manchester United to advance to the semi-final of the FA Cup; it was his third goal in the cup, and fifteenth of the season in all competitions.

On 4 April, it was announced that Wolves had exercised their €38 million option to sign Jiménez on a four-year contract, with the loan move becoming permanent on 1 July. The signing was for a reported club-record £30 million, surpassing Adama Traoré's £18 million transfer. Three days later, he scored his team's second goal in the FA Cup semi-final against Watford at Wembley Stadium, celebrating by putting on a Sin Cara wrestling mask; Wolves eventually lost the match 3–2. Jiménez was labelled disrespectful by former Watford player Luther Blissett.

He scored his 13th Premier League goal on 27 April, heading in a Diogo Jota cross from close range to open the scoring in the 2–1 away win against Watford, becoming the Wolves player with the most goals scored in a single Premier League season. Jiménez scored 17 goals across all competitions, and capped off his season by being voted the Wolves Players' Player of the Season on 15 May.

2019–20 season
On 9 July 2019, Nuno Espírito Santo excused Jiménez from attending the team's pre-season tour in China and as well as possibly the club's Europa League debut in order to rest after the summer activity he had with the Mexico national team. On 1 August, he scored his 50th and 51st goals in Europe after netting a brace against Crusaders in the second qualifying round of the 2019–20 UEFA Europa League. In the third qualifying round, Jiménez scored another brace to help Wolves to a 4–0 first-leg win over Armenian side FC Pyunik. He scored his first Premier League goal of the season on 25 August in the 1–1 draw against Burnley, converting from the penalty spot at the 97th minute. On 2 November, he would score his team's equalizer at the 76th minute in a 1–1 result against Arsenal. On 28 November, he would score a goal and provided two assists in a 3–3 result against Portuguese club Braga. As a result of his November performances, Jiménez was voted PFA Player of the Month.

On 27 December, Jiménez, in scoring Wolves' second goal in their 3–2 home win over Manchester City, scored his eighth goal in the Premier League and 17th across all competitions, equaling his total from the previous season. On 18 January, he would score a brace in a 3–2 victory over Southampton to become Wolves' all-time top scorer in the Premier League. On 20 June, Jiménez broke his own record, set the previous season, for the most goals by a Wolves player in a single Premier League season after scoring a header in the 2–0 away victory over West Ham United. He ended the season with 27 goals in total and was part of the team as they reached the quarter-finals of the UEFA Europa League, but missed a penalty in their elimination to eventual winners Sevilla. Despite this, he was voted Wolves' player of the season by both the fans and his teammates.

2020–21 season
On 14 September, Jiménez made his 100th appearance for Wolves in their first league game of the season, marking the occasion by scoring in the third minute of the match against Sheffield United. He was named Man of the Match by BBC Sport for his performance in the team's 2–0 win. On 3 October, it was announced that Jiménez had signed a four-year contract extension with Wolves, thus effectively ending rumors of a transfer.

On 29 November, five minutes into Wolves' Premier League fixture against Arsenal at the Emirates Stadium, Jiménez was knocked unconscious after a clash of heads with David Luiz. Although Luiz continued to play on for the rest of the first half with minor injuries, Jiménez had to be stretchered off and was immediately taken to a hospital for severe trauma, where he was eventually deemed conscious. It was confirmed the following morning that he had fractured his skull in the clash with Luiz and had required surgery soon after hospitalisation, effectively ending his season.

2021–22 season
Jiménez returned to playing for Wolves in pre-season for the first time since his head injury, but it was announced that he would have to wear a head guard for the rest of his career. Jiménez scored for the first time since his career-threatening injury in his sixth Premier League appearance of the 2021–22 season, a 1–0 victory away to Southampton on 26 September. Jiménez's second goal of the season, scored in a 2–1 win over Everton at Molineux on 1 November, was also his fiftieth for the club in all competitions (as well as his fifth goal against Everton in five appearances).

Jiménez received his first red card of his career with Wolves after collecting two yellow cards in less than a minute during the first half of a 1–0 defeat to Manchester City at the Etihad Stadium on 11 December, resulting in a one-match suspension. He scored his fifth Premier League goal, and his first club goal of 2022, in Wolverhampton's 2–0 win at Tottenham Hotspur on 13 February. He received the second red card of his Wolves career after receiving two yellow cards in a 3–2 defeat at home to Leeds United on 18 March 2022.

2022–23 season
Jiménez made his debut appearance for Wolves in the 2022–23 Premier League, as a second-half substitute, in a 1–0 away defeat against Tottenham Hotspur at the Tottenham Hotspur Stadium on 20 August 2022. He was returning from a number of weeks sidelined with injuries to his knee and groin picked up in a pre-season match, injuries which had kept him out of Wolves's first two games of the Premier League season.

Jiménez's first start for Wolves in the 2022–23 season came in a 2–1 victory over Preston North End at Molineux in the EFL Cup on 23 August 2022, in which he scored Wolves's first in the ninth minute.

International career

Under-23

2012 Toulon Tournament
In 2012, Jiménez was selected by coach Luis Fernando Tena to participate in that year's Toulon Tournament with the under-23 squad. Jiménez managed to score Mexico's third goal in the 4–2 victory over the Netherlands in the semi-finals on 30 May. Mexico would subsequently win the final, defeating Turkey 3–0, with Jiménez earning a starting berth and playing 65 minutes.

2012 Summer Olympics
Jiménez made the final cut in the squad participating in the 2012 Summer Olympics in London. He made his Olympic debut in the group stage match against South Korea on 26 July, which ended in a 0–0 draw, with Jiménez coming in as a substitute and coming close to scoring a late goal, with the ball ricocheting off the goalkeeper's left-hand post. He subsequently made appearances against Switzerland, Senegal, Japan, and Brazil in the final, coming on as a substitute in those matches. Mexico would go on to defeat Brazil 2–1 and win the gold medal.

Senior
Jiménez made his debut for the senior national team in a 1–1 draw against Denmark on 30 January 2013, coming on as a second-half substitute.

2013 FIFA Confederations Cup
On 20 May 2013, Jiménez was named in the 23-man squad participating in the 2013 FIFA Confederations Cup held in Brazil, and featured in all three group games for a combined 96 minutes. On 22 June, he was named in the starting eleven for the third match against Japan, being substituted off in the 90th minute for Javier Aquino in Mexico's 2–0 victory.

2013 CONCACAF Gold Cup
On 26 June 2013, it was announced that Jiménez was included in Mexico's 23-man squad for the 2013 CONCACAF Gold Cup, replacing midfielder David Cabrera due to injury. He was a starter and played in every group stage match, managing to score against Canada in Mexico's 2–0 win on 11 July. On 20 July, Jiménez scored the only goal in the quarterfinal victory over Trinidad and Tobago. Mexico would be eliminated by Panama in the semifinal.

2014 FIFA World Cup
During the World Cup qualifier match against Panama on 11 October 2013, in which Mexico needed a victory to not complicate the qualification process, Jiménez would go on to score a bicycle kick goal that led to Mexico's 2–1 victory; the goal would go on to win the 2013 edition of CONCACAF Goal of the Year. On 5 June 2014, Jiménez was confirmed in coach Miguel Herrera's final 23-man team participating in the 2014 FIFA World Cup. He did not appear in Mexico's opener against Cameroon. On 17 June, Jiménez made his World Cup debut against host nation Brazil, entering as a substitute for Giovani dos Santos in the 84th minute.

2015 Copa América
In Mexico's second game of the 2015 Copa América tournament against hosts Chile, Jiménez headed from a corner to give Mexico the 2–1 lead in an eventual 3–3 draw at the Estadio Nacional. In their next match against Ecuador on 19 June, he scored from the penalty spot after Gabriel Achilier brought down Hugo Ayala, but the 1–2 defeat saw Mexico eliminated in last place in their group.

Copa América Centenario
Jiménez was called up by Juan Carlos Osorio to participate in the Copa América Centenario. He made three appearances but did not score.

2017 FIFA Confederations Cup

Jiménez was included the 2017 FIFA Confederations Cup roster. He scored his only goal in the tournament against New Zealand to tie the game 1–1; the team would go on to win the match 2–1.

2018 FIFA World Cup
Jiménez was named in Mexico's 23-man final squad for the 2018 FIFA World Cup in Russia. He would go on to appear as a substitute in both the first group-stage match against Germany and the round-of-16 match against Brazil, but did not score.

2019 CONCACAF Gold Cup
On 5 June 2019, Jiménez was included in the Mexico squad for the CONCACAF Gold Cup. In the team's debut match against Cuba, Jiménez scored twice in El Tri's 7–0 victory. He scored his third goal in the 3–2 victory over Martinique as Mexico topped Group A and advanced to the knockout round. In the quarter-final match against Costa Rica, Jiménez scored in the 1–1 draw, subsequently missing his penalty in Mexico's 5–4 shootout victory. In the semi-final match against Haiti on 2 July, Jiménez scored the game's only goal via the penalty spot after being fouled in the first half of extra time. In the final against the United States, Jiménez provided a back-heel pass for Jonathan dos Santos' goal, the only one of the match as Mexico won their eighth Gold Cup. He was awarded the Golden Ball Award, playing in all six of Mexico's matches and scoring five goals.

2019–20 CONCACAF Nations League
On 15 November 2019, Jiménez scored a brace and contributed an assist in El Tris 3–0 victory over Panama.

2022 FIFA World Cup
Jiménez was named in Mexico's 26-man final squad for the 2022 FIFA World Cup in Qatar.

Style of play
A forward, Jiménez is known for his physical presence in the penalty area, as well as his ability to hold-up play and his ability in the air, which allows him to head long passes on or bring the ball down and bring others into play. Despite his size, however, he has been described as not just a "traditional number nine," but a "well-rounded player." His playing style has led to comparisons with Zlatan Ibrahimović. Jiménez is also known for his high penalty conversion rate.

Career statistics
Club

International

Scores and results list Mexico's goal tally first.

HonoursAméricaLiga MX: Clausura 2013Atlético MadridSupercopa de España: 2014BenficaPrimeira Liga: 2015–16, 2016–17
Taça de Portugal: 2016–17
Taça da Liga: 2015–16
Supertaça Cândido de Oliveira: 2016, 2017Mexico U23 Olympic Gold Medal: 2012
Toulon Tournament: 2012MexicoCONCACAF Cup: 2015
CONCACAF Gold Cup: 2019Individual'
CONCACAF Goal of the Year: 2013
Taça da Liga top scorer: 2015–16
CONCACAF Gold Cup Golden Ball: 2019
CONCACAF Gold Cup Best XI: 2019
PFA Player of the Month: November 2019
IFFHS CONCACAF Best XI: 2020
Wolverhampton Wanderers Player of the Season: 2019–20
Wolverhampton Wanderers Players' Player of the Season: 2018–19, 2019–20

Notes

References

External links

 Profile at the Wolverhampton Wanderers F.C. website
 
 
 
 
 
 
 

1991 births
Living people
Footballers from Hidalgo (state)
Association football forwards
Club América footballers
Atlético Madrid footballers
S.L. Benfica footballers
Wolverhampton Wanderers F.C. players
Liga MX players
La Liga players
Primeira Liga players
Premier League players
Mexico youth international footballers
Olympic footballers of Mexico
Mexico international footballers
Footballers at the 2012 Summer Olympics
2013 FIFA Confederations Cup players
2013 CONCACAF Gold Cup players
2014 FIFA World Cup players
2015 Copa América players
Copa América Centenario players
2017 FIFA Confederations Cup players
2018 FIFA World Cup players
2019 CONCACAF Gold Cup players
Olympic gold medalists for Mexico
Olympic medalists in football
Medalists at the 2012 Summer Olympics
CONCACAF Gold Cup-winning players
Mexican expatriate footballers
Mexican expatriate sportspeople in Spain
Mexican expatriate sportspeople in Portugal
Mexican expatriate sportspeople in England
Expatriate footballers in Spain
Expatriate footballers in Portugal
Expatriate footballers in England
2022 FIFA World Cup players
Mexican footballers